Jacob Dahlin (13 May 1952 in Kristianstad, Skåne, Sweden — 10 October 1991) was a Swedish TV- and radio-host.

His hosted his first radio program Galaxen ("The Galaxy") in the beginning of the 1980s. Guests included  Swedish comedian Täppas Fogelberg. He later acted on television shows including Jacobs Stege ("Jacob's Ladder") and Caramba!. In almost every episode of Jacobs Stege, Dahlin used the catchphrase "Skål, ta mig fan!" ("Cheers, dammit!").

Dahlin studied the Russian language and often reported about happenings in Russian popular culture. He also went to Moscow with his TV-show Jacobs Stege, broadcasting with the Russian television show, The Morning Post, with Yury Nikolayev as host. Nikolayev later got invited to Sweden to be on Jacobs Stege, and brought with him actress Alla Pugacheva. Pugacheva and Dahlin became friends and she was a frequent guest on his TV-show. One night he had the Soviet and US ambassadors as guests on his TV show, speaking to them fluently in their own languages.

Dahlin also recorded with Pugacheva, including the single "Superman" as a duet. The recording led to Pugacheva getting to record her first entire English-language album, Alla Pugacheva in Stockholm, which was released in 1985.

Guests on his television show included Diana Ross, Boy George, Princess Stéphanie of Monaco, Janet Jackson, Tina Turner, Cher, Donna Summer, Liza Minnelli, Alla Pugacheva, Abba, Agnetha Fältskog, Benny Andersson, Eros Ramazzotti, Rod Stewart, Matia Bazar, and Tommy Körberg.

Dahlin died in October 1991 from an HIV/AIDS-related illness. Dahlin was homosexual. When Pugacheva was competing in the Eurovision Song Contest in 1997 with her song Primadonna, she dedicated the song to him, saying "This song is for you, Jacob" in an interview.

References

External links

1952 births
1991 deaths
Swedish television hosts
Swedish radio presenters
Swedish LGBT broadcasters
Swedish LGBT entertainers
Swedish gay men
AIDS-related deaths in Sweden
Stockholm University alumni
Gay entertainers
20th-century Swedish LGBT people